Wangsiying Area is an area and township located on the southern part of Chaoyang District, Beijing, China. It borders Gaobeidian Township to the north, Dougezhuang to the east, Fatou Subdistrict and Shibalidian Township to the south, and Nanmofang Township to the west. In the year 2020, it has a total population of 127,268.

The area was named Wangsiying after the village where the township government is located. The village in turn was named so for its origin as a station for military personnel.

History

Administrative Divisions 
In 2021, Wangsiying is composed of 11 subdivisions, with 5 residential communities and 6 villages. They are listed in the table below:

See also 
 List of township-level divisions of Beijing

References

Chaoyang District, Beijing
Areas of Beijing